Lieutenant Colonel Philip Edington Rhoden OBE, ED (23 December 1914 – 13 March 2003) was an Australian Army officer in the Second World War and a lawyer. He was commanding officer of the 2/14th Battalion, Second Australian Imperial Force (AIF) from 21 November 1943 to 8 November 1945.  While commanding the battalion, it participated in operations in the Ramu Valley and the Finisterre Mountains, until returning to Australia on 8 March 1944.  Its last actions were at Balikpapan, from 1 July 1945 – remaining as an occupation force after the cessation of hostilities.

Educated at Melbourne Grammar and the University of Melbourne, Rhoden was a solicitor by trade. He was admitted to the Victorian Bar in 1939, and worked for John P Rhoden Solicitors.

References

2003 deaths
1914 births
Australian colonels
Australian Army personnel of World War II
Lawyers from Melbourne
Melbourne Law School alumni
Military personnel from Melbourne
Officers of the Order of the British Empire
People educated at Melbourne Grammar School